The General Secretary of the Central Committee of the Communist Party of the Soviet Union was the leader of the Communist Party of the Soviet Union (CPSU). From 1929 until the union's dissolution in 1991, the officeholder was the recognized leader of the Soviet Union. Officially, the General Secretary solely controlled the Communist Party directly. However, since the party had a monopoly on political power, the General Secretary had executive control of the Soviet government. Because of the office's ability to direct both the foreign and domestic policies of the state and preeminence over the Soviet Communist Party, it was the de facto highest office of the Soviet Union.

History
Before the October Revolution, the job of the party secretary was largely that of a bureaucrat. Following the Bolshevik seizure of power, the Office of the Responsible Secretary was established in 1919 to perform administrative work. After the Bolshevik victory in the Russian Civil War, the Office of General Secretary was created by Vladimir Lenin in 1922 with the intention that it serve a purely administrative and disciplinary purpose. Its primary task would be to determine the composition of party membership and to assign positions within the party. The General Secretary also oversaw the recording of party events, and was entrusted with keeping party leaders and members informed about party activities. When assembling his cabinet, Lenin appointed Joseph Stalin to be General Secretary. Over the next few years, Stalin was able to use the principles of democratic centralism to transform his office into that of party leader, and eventually leader of the Soviet Union.

Prior to Lenin's death in 1924, Stalin's tenure as General Secretary was already being criticized. In Lenin's final months, he authored a pamphlet that called for Stalin's removal on the grounds that Stalin was becoming authoritarian and abusing his power. The pamphlet triggered a political crisis which endangered Stalin's position as General Secretary, and a vote was held to remove him from office. With the help of Grigory Zinoviev and Lev Kamenev, Stalin was able to survive the scandal and remained in his post. After Lenin's death, Stalin began to consolidate his power by using the office of General Secretary. By 1928, he had unquestionably become the de facto leader of the USSR, while the position of General Secretary became the highest office in the nation. In 1934, the 17th Party Congress refrained from formally re-electing Stalin as General Secretary. However, Stalin was re-elected to all the other positions he held, and remained leader of the party without diminution.

In the 1950s, Stalin increasingly withdrew from Secretariat business, leaving the supervision of the body to Georgy Malenkov, possibly to test his abilities as a potential successor. In October 1952, at the 19th Party Congress, Stalin restructured the party's leadership. His request, voiced through Malenkov, to be relieved of his duties in the party secretariat due to his age, was rejected by the party congress, as delegates were unsure about Stalin's intentions. In the end, the congress formally abolished Stalin's office of General Secretary, although Stalin remained one of the party secretaries and maintained ultimate control of the party. When Stalin died on 5 March 1953, Malenkov was considered to be the most important member of the Secretariat, which also included Nikita Khrushchev, among others. Under a short-lived troika consisting of Malenkov, Beria, and Molotov, Malenkov became Chairman of the Council of Ministers, but was forced to resign from the Secretariat nine days later on 14 March. This effectively left Khrushchev in control of the government, and he was elected to the new office of First Secretary of the Communist Party of the Soviet Union at the Central Committee plenum on 14 September that same year. Khrushchev subsequently outmanoeuvred his rivals, who sought to challenge his political reforms. He was able to comprehensively remove Malenkov, Molotov and Lazar Kaganovich (one of Stalin's oldest and closest associates) from power in 1957, an achievement which also helped to reinforce the supremacy of the position of First Secretary.

In 1964, opposition within the Politburo and the Central Committee, which had been increasing since the aftermath of the Cuban Missile Crisis, led to Khrushchev's removal from office. Leonid Brezhnev succeeded Khrushchev as First Secretary, but was initially obliged to govern as part of a collective leadership, forming another troika with Premier Alexei Kosygin and Chairman Nikolai Podgorny. The office was renamed to General Secretary in 1966. The collective leadership was able to limit the powers of the General Secretary during the Brezhnev Era. Brezhnev's influence grew throughout the 1970s as he was able to retain support by avoiding any radical reforms. After Brezhnev's death, Yuri Andropov and Konstantin Chernenko were able to rule the country in the same way as Brezhnev had. Mikhail Gorbachev ruled the Soviet Union as General Secretary until 1990, when the Communist Party lost its monopoly of power over the political system. The office of President of the Soviet Union was established so that Gorbachev could still retain his role as leader of the Soviet Union. Following the failed August coup of 1991, Gorbachev resigned as General Secretary. He was succeeded by his deputy, Vladimir Ivashko, who only served for five days as Acting General Secretary before Boris Yeltsin, the newly elected President of Russia, suspended all activity in the Communist Party. Following the party's ban, the Union of Communist Parties – Communist Party of the Soviet Union (UCP–CPSU) was established by Oleg Shenin in 1993, and is dedicated to reviving and restoring the CPSU. The organisation has members in all the former Soviet republics.

List of officeholders

See also

General Secretary of the Communist Party
General Secretary of the Chinese Communist Party
General Secretary of the Communist Party of Vietnam
General Secretary of the Workers' Party of Korea
First Secretary of the Communist Party of Cuba
President of the League of Communists of Yugoslavia

Notes

Sources

 
 
 
 
 
 
 
 
 
 
 
 
 
 
 
 
 
 
 
 
 
 
 
 
 
 
 

 
1917 establishments in Russia
1922 establishments in the Soviet Union
Soviet Union